Magnús Jónsson (7 September 1919 – 13 January 1984) was an Icelandic politician and former minister. He was the Minister of Finance of Iceland from 1965 to 1971.

He was a member of the Icelandic Order of Freemasons.

References

External links 
Non auto-biography of Magnús Jónsson on the parliament website

1919 births
1984 deaths
Finance ministers of Iceland
Magnus Jonsson
Icelandic Freemasons
Independence Party (Iceland) politicians